Himacerus apterus, known as the tree damsel bug, is a species of damsel bug belonging to the family Nabidae, subfamily Nabinae.

Description
It has black connexivum and orange-red spots with reddish-brown wings. It wingspan is

Distribution
It is found in most of Europe and southern and central Asia. Between 1943 and 1989 the species was found in eastern Nova Scotia.

Diet
The species feeds on mites, aphids and other small insects.

Ecology
Adults lay eggs in late summer on plant stems which hatch in spring. Larvae is found from May to August.

References

External links
Himacerus apterus on Nature Spot

Articles containing video clips
Insects described in 1798
Nabidae